The Boys' octathlon at the 2013 World Youth Championships in Athletics was held on 10 and 11 July. The competition was won by the Norwegian athlete Karsten Warholm who like the other medalists set a new personal best in the event. His result was 40 points behind the world youth record.

Medalists

Records
Prior to the competition, the following records were as follows.

Results

100 metres

Heat 1

Heat 2

Heat 3

Heat 4

Long jump

Shot put

400 metres

Heat 1

Heat 2

Heat 3

Heat 4

110 metres hurdles

Heat 1

Heat 2

Heat 3

Heat 4

High jump

Javelin throw

1000 metres

References 

Octathlon